Qaleh-ye Mohammad Ali (also Romanized as Qal‘eh-ye Moḩammad ‘Alī; also known as Qal‘a Imam Ali, Qal‘eh Imām ‘Ali, and Qal‘eh-ye Moḩammad ‘Alīkhān) is a village in Shirez Rural District, Bisotun District, Harsin County, Kermanshah Province, Iran. At the 2006 census, its population was 159, in 40 families.

References 

Populated places in Harsin County